Sevdim, Sevilmedim / Umrumda Değil: The Remix EP (I Loved But Wasn't Loved / I Don't Care) is a remix EP by Candan Erçetin.

Track listing
Sevdim Sevilmedim (Čaje Šukarije) (Album Version)
Umrumda Değil (An-Anatolian Mix)
Umrumda Değil (Erol T. Ultramix)
Umrumda Değil (Erol T. Ultraclub Mix)
Umrumda Değil (Slm Tranceyclub Mix)
Sevdim Sevilmedim (Extended Version)

Candan Erçetin albums
1996 EPs
1996 remix albums
Remix EPs